The 2017 Republican National Committee (RNC) Chairperson election was held in January 2017, to determine the next chairperson of the Republican National Committee.  The elected chair will be in charge of the national party activities during their two-year term.

Background
Reince Priebus, the longest serving RNC chairman, did not run for reelection. Priebus had been named by President Donald Trump as his White House Chief of Staff.

On December 9, 2016, it was widely reported that President-elect Donald Trump intended to recommend Ronna Romney McDaniel as the person fill this post. On December 14, 2016, Trump announced that McDaniel was his recommendation to be the next chair of the Republican National Committee.  The 168 members of the RNC, all of whom were elected at state and territorial conventions during the primaries and caucuses earlier in 2016, will decide and vote upon their next chair at their January 2017 meeting.  Although historically the recommendation of the Republican nominee for the presidency is usually followed, there is no restriction on who the RNC members may eventually elect.

Candidates

Potential candidates

References

Republican National Committee
2017 in American politics
Republican Party (United States) leadership elections
Republican National Committee
Republican National Committee chairmanship election